William Chamberlain DD (d. 18 May 1666) was a Canon of Windsor from 1660 to 1666

Career
He was educated at Trinity College, Cambridge and graduated BA in 1640, MA in 1643, and DD in 1660.

He was appointed:
Domestic Chaplain to James Butler, 1st Duke of Ormonde
Rector of Orwell, Cambridge 1664 - 1666

He was appointed to the sixth stall in St George's Chapel, Windsor Castle in 1660 and held the canonry until 1666.

Notes 

1666 deaths
Canons of Windsor
Alumni of Trinity College, Cambridge
Year of birth unknown